Chantilly High School is a public high school in the Chantilly CDP in unincorporated Fairfax County, Virginia, United States. It is part of the Fairfax County Public Schools system.

History
Chantilly was originally built in 1972 with open classrooms; these were not fully removed until the 1990s. Classes commenced in 1973.

Administration 
The principal of Chantilly High School is currently Dr. Amy Goodloe. She previously was principal Oak Hill Elementary and Rocky Run Middle School (both of which are in the Chantilly Pyramid). In 2020, she was named FCPS Outstanding Principal.

Academics
Chantilly has a 98% graduation rate and placed in the top 5% of 1,800 Virginia schools for test scores in 2018—2019. During the 2019—2020 academic year, 76% of students passed their AP exams with a score of 3 or higher.

The campus is home to Chantilly Governor's STEM Academy, which provides vocational training for students in the school district interested in culinary arts, information technology, criminal justice, pharmaceuticals, carpentry, engineering, nursing, firefighting, dentistry, and cosmetology. There are also programs for students interested in the United States Air Force or becoming a mechanic. The Academy also participates in the FIRST Robotics Competition.

Student life
During the 2021-2022 academic year, 39% of the school was Asian, 35% was white, 16% was Hispanic, 5% was Black, and 5% was of mixed race.

Extra-curriculars
Among the 90+ clubs and activities offered at Chantilly are the AFROTC, Black Student Association, HOSA, hip hop (K-pop) dance club, Muslim Student Association, neurology club, Science Olympiad, and Woman in Science club.

Athletics
Chantilly offers the following varsity sports: cheerleading, cross country, field hockey, football, golf, volleyball, basketball, gymnastics, swim and dive, track and field, wrestling, baseball, lacrosse, soccer, softball, tennis, dance, and Sports Medicine. Non-varsity athletics groups include Athletic Training Student Aids, Fellowship of Christian Athletes, Ice Hockey Interest Club, Nemaste Yoga Club, Relay for Life, and Ultimate Frisbee Interest.

Arts
The Theatre Department was founded in 1974 and its inaugural season included productions of Daisy I Love You So and Story Theatre. Music co-curriculars include band, color guard, drum line, choir, orchestra and strings ensemble, and Tri-M Music Honor Society and dance clubs include hip hop dance, Stomp and Shake club, and Bhangra.

Misconduct

Faculty
In March 2006, special education teacher Thomas Newlun, 53, allegedly gave a small amount of marijuana to a 17-year-old student in the hallway between classes. Newlun was charged with distribution of marijuana to a minor, drug distribution on school property and contributing to the delinquency of a minor.

On 11 January 2008, Spanish teacher and track coach Matthew McGuire was arrested on charges of using his computer to solicit sex with a minor. Arlington County police arrested McGuire at his Alexandria home after investigating his online activities for several months. According to Alexandria court records, a detective posing as a 13-year-old girl named Jessica had several conversations with McGuire between March and December 2007.

Students
In 2014, eight Chantilly students were photographed wearing shirts that spelled out a racial slur.

Notable alumni
 Rob Balder, syndicated cartoonist, graphic novel author and comedy musician
 Keith Gary, former defensive end for the Pittsburgh Steelers. Also played in the CFL
 Jae "David" Jin, award-winning musician, singer-songwriter, SAG-AFTRA actor, and public speaker.
 Bhawoh Jue, NFL football player drafted by the Green Bay Packers, played for five teams.
 Mike Kohn, U.S. Olympic bobsledder, won Bronze medal in Salt Lake Winter Games 2002, competed in Vancouver Olympics 2010.
 Joe Koshansky, Milwaukee Brewers
 Jon Link, pitcher for the Los Angeles Dodgers
 Sean McGorty, professional runner for Nike
 Yoochun Park, ex-member of South Korean pop groups Dong Bang Shin Ki and JYJ.
 Sean Parker, co-founder of Napster, founder of Plaxo, and former president of Facebook
 Scott Secules, was an NFL quarterback (1988–93) drafted by the Dallas Cowboys who played most of his career with the  Miami Dolphins and New England Patriots.
 Brian Snyder, former Major League Baseball pitcher for the Seattle Mariners and Oakland Athletics.

References

External links 
 

Public high schools in Virginia
High schools in Fairfax County, Virginia
Northern Virginia Scholastic Hockey League teams
Educational institutions established in 1973
1973 establishments in Virginia